Jamshedpur Worker's College, established in 1957, is a general degree college in the Jharkhand state of India. It offers undergraduate and postgraduate courses in arts, commerce and sciences. It is constituent  to  Kolhan University.

Departments

Science
Chemistry 
Physics 
Mathematics 
Botany 
Zoology

Arts and Commerce

Bengali
Hindi
English
History
Psychology
Political Science
Economics
Philosophy
Education
Commerce

See also
Education in India
Literacy in India
List of institutions of higher education in Jharkhand

References

External links
 http://www.jwcmango.ac.in/

Colleges affiliated to Kolhan University
Educational institutions established in 1957
Universities and colleges in Jharkhand
Education in Jamshedpur
1957 establishments in Bihar